Captive Souls is a 1913 Hungarian film directed by Michael Curtiz.

Cast
 Alfréd Deésy as Mihunka, cirkuszigazgató
 Sári Fedák as Ágnes, Kertay felesége
 Márton Rátkai as John Bull, hipnotizõr
 Elemér Thury as Kertay, kovácsmester

See also
 Michael Curtiz filmography

References

External links
 

Films directed by Michael Curtiz
1913 films
Hungarian black-and-white films
Hungarian silent feature films
Austro-Hungarian films